John Pride III (after around 1737 – 1794)  was an American politician from Virginia. Pride served in both houses of the Virginia General Assembly, and as Clerk of Court for Amelia County. He was a delegate to the Virginia Ratifying Convention of 1788, and a presidential elector in 1789 and 1792.

Family

He was a son of John Pride Jr (? - lived at least until 1773) and Frances Rowlett (born perhaps around 1717 - lived at least until 1785).  His parents 'apparently married, perhaps around 1737'.  His father had received  on Swift Creek in 1733 and his parents moved to Amelia County by 1746. John Pride III served as Clerk of Court for Amelia in the years before the Revolution.

State elective office

He served as member of the Virginia House of Delegates from Amelia County (1778–82, 1786–87) and the Senate of Virginia (1787–93).  On 4 January 1779 he received £82-8-0 for his wages as delegate from Amelia County. On 22 December 1781, the serjeant at arms was ordered to take Pride and a number of other delegates into his custody   On 1 December 1790, as Speaker of the Senate of Virginia, he signed a letter to the other state legislatures requesting their co-operation in procuring 'the admission of the citizens of the United States to hear the debates of the United States Senate whenever they are sitting in their legislative capacity.'  Again as Speaker of the Senate of Virginia, he signed the resolutions dated 15 December 1791 ratifying the Bill of Rights.

1788 Convention

Pride served as a representative from Amelia County to the Virginia Ratifying Convention of 1788 which ratified the United States Constitution. He voted against ratification.

Presidential Elector
He was chosen as an elector for the 1789 election from Amelia District. That District consisted of Amelia County, Brunswick County, Chesterfield County,  Cumberland County, Greensville County, Lunenburg County, Mecklenburg County and Powhatan County, which cover the area west of Petersburg, Virginia and then south to the state border with North Carolina.
All of the 10 electors from Virginia who voted cast one of their two votes for George Washington.  5 of them cast their other vote for John Adams.  3 cast theirs for George Clinton.  1 cast his for John Hancock.  1 cast his for John Jay.  Clinton was a leading Antifederalist, a view which he shared with Pride, who had voted against ratification as set out above.  It therefore seems likely that Pride was one of the three electors who cast their other vote for Clinton.

He was again chosen as an elector in 1792.  In that year his District comprised Amelia County, Chesterfield County, Nottoway County, (which had been formed out of Amelia County by an Act of 1788) and Powhatan County, which cover the area west of Petersburg, Virginia.

Vestry of Raleigh Parish

He was elected as a vestryman of Raleigh Parish in Amelia County in 1790.

Trustee
In an Act of the Virginia General Assembly passed on 17 December 1787 he was named as a trustee of funds to be raised for clearing, improving and extending the navigation of the Appomattox River 

In an Act of the Virginia General Assembly passed on 1 December 1791 he was named as a trustee of funds to be raised by Scottville Lodge of Free Masons for building an Academy

References

1794 deaths
18th-century American people
Members of the Virginia House of Delegates
Virginia state senators
Year of birth unknown
County clerks in Virginia
Delegates to the Virginia Ratifying Convention
18th-century American politicians
People from Amelia County, Virginia